River Dove or Dove River may refer to:

In England
 River Dove, Central England
 River Dove, Suffolk
 River Dove, North Yorkshire
 River Dove, Barnsley

In Australia
 Dove River, Tasmania

In New Zealand
 Dove River, New Zealand (disambiguation)